Chyormoz is a town in Ilyinsky District of Perm Krai, Russia, located on the shores of the Kama Reservoir,  north of Perm, the administrative center of the krai. Population: .

History

It was founded in 1701. In 1763 baron Nikolay Stroganov founded a steel mill in Chyormoz, which was later sold to Ivan Lazarev. In 1943 Chyormoz was granted town status. In 1956, the mill was closed, as it was in a flood zone of the Kama Reservoir.

Administrative and municipal status
Within the framework of administrative divisions, Chyormoz is subordinated to Ilyinsky District. As a municipal division, the town of Chyormoz, together with twelve rural localities, is incorporated within Ilyinsky Municipal District as Chyormozskoye Urban Settlement.

Before 1959 the town was the seat of Chyormozsky District.

References

Notes

Sources

External links
Official website of Chyormoz 
Chyormoz Business Directory 

Cities and towns in Perm Krai
Populated places in Ilyinsky District, Perm Krai
Solikamsky Uyezd
Populated places on the Kama River